FireDaemon Pro is an operating system service management application. FireDaemon Pro allows you to install and run most standard Windows applications as a service. These include regular standard Windows executables as well as applications written in scripting or pcode languages such as Perl, Java, Python and Ruby. FireDaemon is popular amongst the online gaming community for running dedicated servers such as Minecraft, Rust, and America's Army.

It is possible to add services to Windows without FireDaemon Pro or use other free tools found in the Windows Resource Kits. However, setting up services manually can be complicated and error-prone as the Windows registry needs to be edited directly. Windows services by default will generally be restarted after a minimum of 1 minute has passed. However, FireDaemon Pro proactively monitors the application and ensures an immediate restart. This can be critical when using server-based applications such as web servers, SFTP servers, etc.

Installation Procedure
FireDaemon Pro is available as a .exe package. The installation package doesn't contain any malware or spyware and deploys not only the product but also the Microsoft Visual C++ Runtime.

Licensing
FireDaemon Pro is currently released as licensed software. In the past, there was a free "Lite" version that was limited to a single service, but it has since been officially discontinued. It can be sourced by searching for "FireDaemon Lite".

Limitations 
FireDaemon Pro is sometimes unable to close all error popup windows for applications such as Source Dedicated Server. This is because FireDaemon only intercepts popups of type WS_POPUP and the window class is #32770. Workarounds include leaving the computer logged in rather than logged out or writing custom GUI automation scripts with tools such as AutoIT to automatically close popups. Windows Error Reporting can also interfere with the correct function FireDaemon Pro and should generally be disabled.

Security Issues
FireDaemon Lite was used in a variety of trojans and worms from around 1999 to 2004 that exploited various security holes in Windows (e.g. Symantec: W32. Tkbot. Worm, Backdoor. Vmz, NAI: Generic Dropper.h, BAT/Mumu.worm.c). Typically, very old or cracked versions of FireDaemon would have been included in the trojan/worm payload and was used to run tools that facilitated the establishment of botnets (e.g. IRC, FTP servers). The use of FireDaemon in botnets is well documented across several security forums as well as written about in several books on botnets and internet security (e.g. Hacking Exposed). Probably the best known botnet that included FireDaemon is XDCC. On rare occasions, anti-malware products may misidentify recent legitimate versions of FireDaemon Pro as being a potential threat by performing "trojan like behaviour". Advances in anti-malware software since 2005 has resulted in malware authors ceasing to use FireDaemon Pro. As such, there have been no reports of FireDaemon Pro being used in malware since 2005.

See also 
 Operating system service management

References

External links 
 
 Trojan/Worm Cleanup Notes

Windows-only software